Barker & Nourse was an architectural firm from Worcester, Massachusetts, active from 1879 to 1904.

History
The principals of the firm were Albert A. Barker (1852-1905) and Walter B. Nourse (1853-1906), and it operated from 1879 to 1904.  It was established March 1, 1879, as the successor to the practice of obscure architect John E. Holman, who was briefly a partner of Amos P. Cutting. It was then dissolved January 1, 1904, with each partner continuing their practices individually. In its day, Barker & Nourse was primarily known for its residential and educational designs.

Partner biographies
Albert Augustus Barker was born in Guadalajara on November 20, 1852, to John B. Barker. The elder Barker died in 1860, and the family relocated to Bennington, New Hampshire. They went to Worcester in 1865, and thus young Barker completed his education. He entered the office of E. Boyden & Son, where he appears to have remained until 1879, when he established Barker & Nourse with W. B. Nourse. After the firm was dissolved in January 1904, Barker entered private practice. He died June 9, 1905.

Walter B. Nourse was born in Westborough, Massachusetts in 1855. He worked in the office of Amos P. Cutting before establishing Barker & Nourse with A. A. Barker. After the dissolution of Barker & Nourse, he practiced alone until his death in 1906.

Legacy
A number of its works are listed on the United States National Register of Historic Places, and others contribute to listed historic districts.

Works

Architectural drawings

Notes

References

Architecture firms based in Massachusetts